The Sungai Buloh station is an integrated railway station serving the suburb of Sungai Buloh in Selangor, Malaysia, which is located to the northwest of Kuala Lumpur.

It is an interchange station, with one section catering to the KTM Komuter Port Klang Line and KTM ETS services, and another section for the MRT Putrajaya Line (formerly the MRT Kajang line). However, there is no paid-area integration between both sections as the two services use different ticketing systems. The newly built integrated station was opened on 16 December 2016 together with the opening of the first phase of the Kajang Line.

The station was the northern terminus of the Kajang Line until October 2021. The MRT station was closed along with Kampung Selamat and Kwasa Damansara stations until the opening of the Putrajaya line. Their transfer to the Putrajaya line was completed when it began partial operations on June 16, 2022.

Location
The station is located north of Jalan Kuala Selangor near the intersection with Jalan Sungai Buloh, and also Jalan Hospital. The station is located at the same location as the former Sungai Buloh railway station, of which part of the structure is still being used and integrated with the new station.

History

First station
The first Sungai Buloh railway station opened in 1892 when the section of the main railway line, now the KTM West Coast Line between Batu Junction and Rawang was opened.

Old KTM Komuter station

The station underwent refurbishment as part of the Klang Valley Electrification and Double Tracking Project which saw the station becoming one of the stations of the KTM Komuter service in 1995. The station was originally on the Rawang-Seremban Line until 2016 when a revamp of the KTM Komuter service saw the station serving the KTM Port Klang Line with trains running between Tanjung Malim and Port Klang.

The station had four tracks, with two side platforms serving the two outer tracks, and the two inner tracks served as bypass tracks for KTM ETS or freight trains that did not stop at the station. A pedestrian overhead bridge, which later had lifts to make the bridge disabled friendly, linked to the two platforms. The main entrance together with the main station building was located on the south-bound platform.

Integrated interchange station

When construction of the Klang Valley Mass Rapid Transit (MRT) Project began in 2010, the MRT station was designed to be one of four interchange stations between the MRT Kajang Line and the Keretapi Tanah Melayu railway network. The other interchange stations are Muzium Negara (to KL Sentral), Pasar Seni (to Kuala Lumpur) and Kajang.

The new station was constructed next to then existing KTM station building, occupying what was previously the at-grade open-air car park. The MRT section and common concourse of the station, which is partially over KTM tracks, was built while the KTM station remained in-operation throughout the construction period.

The integrated station opened as part of the opening of Phase One of the MRT Kajang Line on 16 December 2016.

With the completion and opening of the new integrated station, the old KTM station structure was dismantled. The KTM ticketing office and other offices were relocated from the old station to the common concourse of the new station building. Only the original KTM station platforms were retained, while the old entrance at the southbound platform was sealed off. The platforms were renovated to enable access to the new KTM concourse.

Station layout

The station has a total of six tracks and three platforms, of which 4 tracks and 2 platforms are serviced by KTM and the other 2 tracks and a platform is serviced by the MRT.

The station has a common elevated concourse shared by the MRT and the KTM. The ticket vending machines and ticketing offices for both services, as well as two retail outlets are located at this common concourse. The concourse was constructed over the four KTM tracks.

From this common concourse, stairs, escalators and lifts descend from within the KTM paid area beyond the faregates to the two at-grade side platforms which were the existing platforms of the previous KTM station. Similarly beyond the MRT faregates, stairs, escalators and lifts bring passengers up to the MRT concourse level and the a further level up to the single island platform of the MRT line.

The paid areas for both services however are not connected and there is no paid-area-to-paid-area integration. This is because the KTM and MRT use different ticketing systems.

Exits and entrances
The station has two entrances. The main entrance is Entrance A which has escalators, stairs and lifts rising from at-grade level to the common concourse, serving both MRT and KTM users. The other entrance is Entrance B is located at the south side of the common concourse and is linked to a staircase down to both sides of Jalan Kuala Selangor (Federal Highway 54).

Park and ride facility
As part of the construction of the MRT Kajang Line, a six-storey multi-storey park and ride facility was also constructed at this station. The facility has about 1,200 parking bays. The parking charge is RM4.30 per day and can only be paid by using Touch 'n Go cards.

Train services

The Sungai Buloh station is served by the following train services:
Keretapi Tanah Melayu (KTM)
 Port Klang Line
 KTM ETS (limited number of trains)
 MRT Putrajaya Line

When Phase One operations for the MRT Putrajaya Line began on June 16, 2022, this station became a part of this line. It ceased to be part of the Kajang Line. The portion of the line between this station and Kwasa Damansara was transferred to the Putrajaya Line, making Kwasa Damansara the new northern terminus of the Kajang Line as well as the Putrajaya Line.

Bus Services

Feeder Bus Services

With the opening of the MRT Kajang Line, feeder buses also began operating linking the station with several housing areas and villages in and near Sungai Buloh. The feeder buses operate from the station's feeder bus hub accessed via Entrance A of the station.

Trunk Bus Services
Trunk bus services do not enter the station area but stop at bus stops along Jalan Kuala Selangor. From these bus stops, access to the station is via the overhead pedestrian bridge to Entrance B of the station.

Gallery

Concourse and platform

Entrance

See also
 Subang Jaya and  Kajang stations are designed in a similar fashion to the Sungai Buloh station.

References

External links
 Klang Valley Mass Rapid Transit website
 MRT Sungai Buloh Station
 KL MRT and KTM Komuter Integration

Railway stations in Selangor
Rapid transit stations in Selangor
Rawang-Seremban Line
Sungai Buloh-Kajang Line
Railway stations opened in 2016